Echeveria derenbergii, the painted-lady, is a species of flowering plant in the family Crassulaceae, endemic to Mexico.

Description

It bears racemes of bell-shaped yellow flowers with "painted" red tips in winter.

Cultivation
Echeveria derenbergii is cultivated as an ornamental plant for rock gardens and as a potted plant. Like other Echeverias, it rapidly produces a colony of small offsets which can be separated from the parent plant.

In cooler temperate regions, it requires winter protection, as it does not tolerate temperatures below ; but it may be placed outside in a sheltered spot during summer months. It has gained the Royal Horticultural Society's Award of Garden Merit.

Etymology
Echeveria is named for Atanasio Echeverría y Godoy, a botanical illustrator who contributed to Flora Mexicana.

References

External links  

Endemic flora of Mexico
Garden plants of North America
Drought-tolerant plants
derenbergii